Atif Maqbool (born 21 November 1981) is a Pakistani first-class cricketer who played for Karachi. He played in 60 first-class and 48 List A matches between 2001 and 2014. In 2014, he was described as one of the top spinners in Pakistan at the time.

References

External links
 

1981 births
Living people
Pakistani cricketers
Karachi cricketers
Defence Housing Authority cricketers
Cricketers from Karachi